Mowe is a town in Obafemi Owode Local Government Area of Ogun State, Nigeria. The town is located along the Lagos-Ibadan Expressway.

References

Populated places in Ogun State